Stanley Brown Thomas (born July 11, 1949) is a former professional baseball pitcher. Thomas pitched in all or part of four seasons in Major League Baseball from 1974 until 1977.

Amateur career
Thomas attended Florida State University and the University of New Haven. From 1968 to 1970, he played collegiate summer baseball in the Cape Cod Baseball League for the Yarmouth Red Sox.

Professional career
Thomas was originally drafted by the Washington Senators in the 27th round of the 1971 Major League Baseball Draft. The next season, the Senators became the Texas Rangers, and Thomas made his major league debut in 1974 for that team. After two seasons in Texas, he was traded along with Ron Pruitt from the Rangers to the Cleveland Indians for John Ellis at the Winter Meetings on December 9, 1975. Thomas was chosen in the 1976 MLB expansion draft by the Seattle Mariners. He split the 1977 season between the Mariners and the New York Yankees to end his major league career. He was dealt along with cash from the Yankees to the Chicago White Sox for Jim Spencer and Tommy Cruz on December 12, 1977. The transaction also included an exchange of minor-league right‐handed pitcher, with Ed Ricks going to the White Sox and Bob Polinsky to the Yankees.

References

External links

1949 births
Living people
Major League Baseball pitchers
Cleveland Indians players
New York Yankees players
Seattle Mariners players
Texas Rangers players
Burlington Rangers players
Geneva Senators players
Petroleros de Zulia players
Pittsfield Rangers players
Spokane Indians players
Syracuse Chiefs players
Tucson Toros players
Yarmouth–Dennis Red Sox players
Baseball players from Maine
People from Rumford, Maine
New Haven Chargers baseball players